The Correspondence with Enemies Act 1793 (33 Geo.3 c.27) was an Act of the British Parliament passed at the beginning of the French Revolutionary Wars. France had declared war on Great Britain on 1 February; the Act was passed on 7 May to prohibit trade between the countries.

Provisions of the Act

The Act made it high treason for any person resident in Great Britain to "knowingly and wilfully" supply materials to France during the war, without a licence from the king. Buying land in France, or lending somebody money with which to buy land in France, was also made treason. Merely travelling to France was punishable with imprisonment for up to 6 months. Any insurance policy relating to any ship or wares belonging to French subjects was made void. The rules of procedure and evidence contained in the Treason Act 1695 and the Treason Act 1708 were to apply to treason under this Act. The Act did not apply to anyone in the army or navy (but such people were subject to military or naval law instead).

Commencement

The Act contained an unusual feature, in that instead of coming into force on one particular date, it instead came into force on different dates in different parts of the world. It came into force in May 1793 in respect of acts done in Great Britain, and also in May in respect of anything done outside of Great Britain by anyone who had been in Great Britain at any time after 1 April. It came into force on 1 June in respect of anything done in Europe (other than Great Britain) by anyone who had not been in Great Britain at any time between 1 April and 1 June. It came into force on 1 August as to any acts done outside Europe, but not beyond the Cape of Good Hope, by anyone who had not been in Great Britain between 1 April and 1 August. It came into force on 1 November in respect of anything done beyond the Cape of Good Hope by anyone who had not been in Great Britain between 1 April and 1 November 1793.

The Netherlands

In 1798 the provisions of the Act were extended to cover the Batavian Republic (the French-occupied Netherlands) by 38 Geo.3 c. 28. (That Act had commencement provisions similar to the 1793 Act.)

References
Statutes at Large, vol. XII, London: Eyre, Straham, Woodfall (1794).

See also
Treason Act
High treason in the United Kingdom
Acts of Parliament (Commencement) Act 1793

Great Britain Acts of Parliament 1793
Treason in the United Kingdom